Cancridae is a family of crabs. It comprises six extant genera, and ten exclusively fossil genera, in two subfamilies:

Extant Genera
Cancrinae Latreille, 1802
Anatolikos Schweitzer & Feldmann, 2000
Cancer Linnaeus, 1758
Glebocarcinus Nations, 1975
Metacarcinus A. Milne-Edwards, 1862
Platepistoma Rathbun, 1906
Romaleon Gistel, 1848

Fossils
Cancrinae Latreille, 1802
†Anisospinos Schweitzer & Feldmann, 2000
†Ceronnectes De Angeli & Beschin, 1998
†Cyclocancer Beurlen, 1958
†Microdium Reuss, 1867
†Notocarcinus Schweitzer & Feldmann, 2000
†Santeecarcinus Blow & Manning, 1996
†Sarahcarcinus Blow & Manning, 1996
†Lobocarcininae Beurlen, 1930
†Lobocarcinus Reuss, 1857
†Miocyclus Müller, 1978
†Tasadia Müller in Janssen & Müller, 1984
Until 2000, the extant species were all classified in genus Cancer. After an analysis of new fossil material, the subgenera were elevated to the rank of genus, and three new genera were erected. Most of the family's current diversity is found in temperate waters of the Northern Hemisphere.

References

External links

Cancroidea
Decapod families